Leonard Giunchi (Kiev 17 January 1896 – 18 March 1967) was an Italian boxer who competed in the 1920 Summer Olympics. He was born in Rome. In 1920 he was eliminated in the first round of the lightweight class after losing his fight to Julien Van Muyzen.

References

External links
 profile
Link la vera storia di Leo Giunchi 

1896 births
1967 deaths
Boxers from Rome
Lightweight boxers
Olympic boxers of Italy
Boxers at the 1920 Summer Olympics
Italian male boxers